Reginald Carey Franklin (30 April 1880 – 25 June 1957) was an English cricketer.  Franklin was a right-handed batsman who bowled leg break.  He was born at Radford, Warwickshire, and was educated at Repton School.

Franklin made a single first-class appearance for Warwickshire against Derbyshire at North Road Ground, Glossop in the 1900 County Championship.  Warwickshire won the toss and elected to bat, making 118 all out.  Franklin, who captained Warwickshire in what was his only appearance in first-class cricket, was dismissed for a duck by Billy Bestwick.  In a match heavily affected by rain, Derbyshire reached 67/5 before the match was declared a draw.

He died at Saltdean, Sussex, on 25 June 1957.

References

External links
Reginald Franklin at ESPNcricinfo
Reginald Franklin at CricketArchive

1880 births
1957 deaths
Cricketers from Coventry
People educated at Repton School
English cricketers
Warwickshire cricketers
Warwickshire cricket captains
People from Saltdean